Jasna Đoković is a Montenegrin professional football midfielder who plays for Bosnia and Herzegovina Women's Premier League club SFK 2000 and the Montenegrin women's national team.

Honours

Player

Club
Ekonomist 
Montenegrin Women's Premier League: 2012–13, 2013–14

SFK 2000 
Bosnian Women's Premier League: 2014–15, 2015–16, 2016–17, 2017–18, 2018–19
Bosnian Women's Cup: 2014–15, 2015–16, 2016–17, 2017–18, 2018–19

References

External links
Jasna Đoković at NFSBiH

1991 births
Living people
Montenegrin women's footballers
Montenegrin expatriate footballers
Montenegro women's international footballers
Expatriate women's footballers in Bosnia and Herzegovina
Women's association football midfielders
ŽFK Ekonomist players